Siegmar Gutzeit (born 25 March 1952) is a German fencer. He competed in the team foil events for East Germany at the 1980 Summer Olympics.

References

External links
 

1952 births
Living people
People from Böhlen
German male fencers
Olympic fencers of East Germany
Fencers at the 1980 Summer Olympics
Sportspeople from Saxony